This is a list of flag bearers who have represented Papua New Guinea at the Olympics.

Flag bearers carry the national flag of their country at the opening ceremony of the Olympic Games.

See also
Papua New Guinea at the Olympics

References

Papua New Guinea at the Olympics
Papua New Guinea
Olympic flagbearers